KODY (1240 AM) is a radio station broadcasting a News Talk Information format. Licensed to North Platte, Nebraska, United States, the station serves the North Platte area.  The station is currently owned by Armada Media - McCook, LLC and features programming from Premiere Radio Networks and Talk Radio Network.

KODY is also a Nebraska Cornhuskers affiliate, along with being the exclusive home for North Platte Saint Patrick's athletics.

References

External links

ODY